The Institute for State Effectiveness (ISE) is a non-governmental organization based in Washington, D.C. that seeks to address the challenge of accountability and governance through a system-building approach across governments, markets and people. ISE was founded by Ashraf Ghani, future President of Afghanistan.

Leadership and history
ISE was founded in 2005 by Ashraf Ghani and Clare Lockhart. Mr. Ghani served as chairman until 2011, when he returned to Afghanistan to lead the Afghan Transition Team. As of April 2014, Ms. Lockhart serves as CEO of ISE. The Institute's work has focused on Afghanistan as well as through East Africa and Central Asia, and across international markets.

 Retrieved September 18, 2020 The Institute focused on building coalitions for reform, implementing large-scale policies, and training the next generation of development professionals to read country context and collaborate with local actors.

Organizational goals 
The Institute uses a citizen-centered perspective to rethink the fundamentals of the relationship between citizens, the state and the market in the context of globalization. The organization feels that stability and prosperity in our interdependent world demand a new global compact to ensure that the billions of people currently excluded become stakeholders in the emerging political and economic order.

References 

Nonpartisan organizations in the United States
Political and economic think tanks in the United States
Foreign policy and strategy think tanks in the United States
Non-profit organizations based in Washington, D.C.
Organizations established in 2005